Caminicella is a Gram-negative, anaerobic, thermophilic, heterotrophic, spore-forming, rod-shaped and motile bacterial genus from the family of Clostridiaceae  with one known species (Caminicella sporogenes).

References

Clostridiaceae
Bacteria genera
Monotypic bacteria genera